Šaľa is a town in south-western Slovakia.

Geography
The town is located on the Danubian Lowland, on both banks of the Váh River, around 65 km from Bratislava and 30 km from Nové Zámky. Except the town itself, it has also the borough of Veča on the left bank of the river and settlements of Hetméň and Kilič. The town lies in the warm climatic zone.

History
The town was first mentioned in 1002 in a document of Pannonhalma abbey. It was promoted in 1536 into a market town. It was also ruled by Ottomans between 1663 and 1686 as part of Uyvar Eyalet. The railway, built in 1850 between Vienna and Budapest speeded development. After 1918, the town became part of Czechoslovakia, however belonging for a short time between 1938 and 1945 again to Hungary before being returned to Czechoslovakia.

Demographics
According to the 2011 census, the town had 23.554 inhabitants. 69% of inhabitants were Slovaks, 12% Hungarians, and 19% other nationality.
According to the 2001 census, the town had 24,564 inhabitants. 79.72% of inhabitants were Slovaks, 17.88% Hungarians, 0.48% Czechs and 0.40% Roma. The religious make-up was 66.63% Roman Catholics, 23.62% people with no religious affiliation and 4.00% Lutherans.

Economy
The economy of the town is primarily based on the chemical industry, by the company Duslo, a.s. Šaľa, bit east of the town. Other sectors include textile and construction industry.

Twin towns — sister cities

Šaľa is twinned with:

 Końskie, Poland
 Kuhmo, Finland
 Oroszlány, Hungary
 Telč, Czech Republic
 Mohyliv-Podilskyi, Ukraine

See also
 FK Slovan Duslo Šaľa

References

External links

 Official website
 Map of Sala

Cities and towns in Slovakia
Villages and municipalities in Šaľa District